Ernie Pilcher (1 August 1896 – 1980) was a British cyclist. He competed in two events at the 1924 Summer Olympics.

References

External links
 

1896 births
1980 deaths
British male cyclists
Olympic cyclists of Great Britain
Cyclists at the 1924 Summer Olympics
Place of birth missing